Isabelle Melançon is a Canadian politician, who was elected to the National Assembly of Quebec in a by-election on December 5, 2016. She represented the electoral district of Verdun as a member of the Quebec Liberal Party caucus until her defeat in the 2022 Quebec general election.

Electoral record

Verdun

Saguenay

References 

Living people
Members of the Executive Council of Quebec
People from Verdun, Quebec
Politicians from Montreal
Quebec Liberal Party MNAs
Women government ministers of Canada
Women MNAs in Quebec
Year of birth missing (living people)